Chi-Chi's can either refer to a defunct Mexican food restaurant chain founded in the United States in 1975, which continued in Europe only as a single restaurant after the North American owner declared bankruptcy and folded in 2004, or to its namesake brand of Mexican food grocery products produced and marketed when the original North American restaurant chain owner sold the rights to use its name on said products in 1987.

Restaurant chain

Chi-Chi's is a single Mexican restaurant currently operating in Vienna, Austria, that is the only remnant left of a much larger chain. The company was briefly owned by Tumbleweed, Inc. The chain also once operated in the United States and Canada but exited those countries in 2004, and closed their Germany and Belgium locations in 2022.

Founding
Chi-Chi's was founded in 1975 in Richfield, Minnesota, a suburb of Minneapolis, by restaurateur Marno McDermott (his wife's nickname was "Chi Chi") and former Green Bay Packers player Max McGee. McDermott had previously founded the Zapata fast-food Mexican chain, which later became Zantigo.  From 1977 to 1986, the chain was run by former KFC executive Shelly Frank. When Frank took leadership, the chain moved its headquarters to his hometown of Louisville.
By March 1995, the chain had grown to 210 locations.

Management and marketing
In 2001, Chi-Chi's applied for a trademark on the word "salsafication" but was denied by the Trademark Trial and Appeal Board.
The company's slogans were "A celebration of food" and, later, "Life always needs a little salsa."

Bankruptcy, hepatitis A, and closure in United States and Canada
Chi-Chi's last owner while the company was still in business in the United States and Canada was Prandium Inc., which had filed for bankruptcy several times, including in 1993 as Restaurant Enterprises Group Inc. and again in 2002 as Prandium.  On October 8, 2003, Chi-Chi's and Koo Koo Roo, another Prandium subsidiary, filed for Chapter 11 bankruptcy themselves.

In November 2003, a month after filing for Chapter 11 bankruptcy, Chi-Chi's was hit with the largest hepatitis A outbreak in American history, with at least four deaths and 660 other victims of illness in the Pittsburgh area, including high school students who caught the disease from the original victims. Chi-Chi's settled the hepatitis A lawsuits by July 2004. At the time the suits were settled, Chi-Chi's had only 65 restaurants, fewer than half of the number of four years prior.

In August 2004, Outback Steakhouse bid $42.5 million for the rights to buy its choice of Chi-Chi's 76 properties, but did not purchase the Chi-Chi's name, operations, or recipes.  On the weekend of September 18, 2004, Chi-Chi's closed all 65 of its remaining restaurants. Outback had hoped to convert many of the properties to its own restaurants, but instead eventually sold the majority of the properties to Kimco Realty Corporation, a real estate investment trust company in New Hyde Park, New York.

Europe

Chi-Chi's master franchise now belongs to a Swiss company which franchises Chi-Chi's in Europe, the Middle East, Asia, and North Africa, the best-represented country being Belgium, with 3 units.

In 2002, Francis Leroy of Belgium purchased the master franchise for Belgium, and later the master franchises for Europe in 2008, North Africa in 2011, and China in 2012.

The European-based company tried to expand into Denmark in 2011 but no reliable citation can be found when the Danish restaurants were closed.

In the first half of 2015, the chain in Belgium had to close five under-performing restaurants.

Chi-Chi's expanded into Austria by opening their first restaurant in Vienna in 2018.

The last snapshot of the European chain's official website in January 2022 showed that the company had three locations left, two in Liege and one in Brugge, all in Belgium. There is no evidence that the website was active much beyond May 2022. The Brugge location announced on Facebook that it was closing in  October 2022.

Grocery brand

In 1987, Hormel Foods acquired the rights to produce and market Chi-Chi's branded salsa and related products in the United States. By 1996, Hormel was making $60-million annually from this product line. In 2009, Hormel formed a 50%-50% joint venture with Mexico-based food manufacturer Herdez Del Fuerte called MegaMex Foods, LLC, to manufacture and distribute Mexican food products in the United States. The Chi-Chi's brand was placed in this new company along with other related food brands such as Herdez, La Victoria and Búfalo brands. Besides salsas, the Chi-Chi's brand also include dips, tortillas, tortilla chips and taco seasoning mixes. Chi-Chi's branded food products are usually found in major supermarkets and discount stores.

In April 2021, MegaMex hired a TikTok personality to be their Chi-Chi's brand ambassador for that year's Cinco de Mayo advertising period.

See also 
 List of Tex-Mex restaurants

References 

Mexican restaurants
Defunct restaurant chains in the United States
Restaurants established in 1975
Restaurants disestablished in 2004
Companies that filed for Chapter 11 bankruptcy in 2003
Defunct restaurants in the United States
Tex-Mex restaurants
Hormel Foods brands
1975 establishments in Minnesota
2004 disestablishments in Minnesota
American companies established in 1975
American companies disestablished in 2004